Daniel Edouward Boffin (born 10 July 1965) is a Belgian former professional footballer who played as a left winger and current football coach.

During his professional career, which spanned nearly two decades, he played for four clubs in his country – most notably Anderlecht – and one in France, appearing in nearly 600 official games as a professional.

Boffin represented Belgium in three World Cups, the last of which occurred when he was 37.

Club career
Born in Sint-Truiden, Boffin began playing professionally for local Sint-Truidense VV, in the Belgian Second Division. After two solid years he moved to the Pro League with RFC Liège, appearing in European competition with the club and also being instrumental as it won its first-ever domestic cup, in 1990.

At the age of 26, after more than 150 official games for Liège, Boffin signed with national giants R.S.C. Anderlecht, continuing to be an undisputed starter in his career: in his first two seasons combined he scored 13 goals, helping lead the Brussels-based team to three leagues in a row as five managers were in charge of the team during his six-year spell. On 8 December 1993, he scored with his (weak) right foot to take a 3–0 lead at Werder Bremen in the UEFA Champions League group stage, but the German club made an unlikely recovery to take the match 5–3.

Boffin moved abroad aged 32 as he signed with FC Metz, where he was dubbed La mobylette due to his speed. In his debut campaign, which started on 2 August 1997 with a 1–0 win at Olympique Lyonnais, he helped to a best-ever finish in Ligue 1, a second place; in spite of his age, he continued to feature regularly for the French side.

In January 2001, Boffin returned to his first club, helping it always maintain its top flight status while the player posted the best scoring records of his career, with 11 and 12 goals in two separate seasons. He split his final year, 2003–04, with Sint-Truiden and Standard Liège, and eventually called it quits at 39 years of age, with totals of – in the Belgian top level alone – 415 matches and 67 goals (he still played some amateur football with VV Real Nieuwerkerken).

International career
Boffin played 53 games for the Belgium national team, during 13 years. His debut came on 23 August 1989, in a 3–0 friendly win with Denmark.

In the following decade, Boffin would be an important offensive member for the Diables Rouges, being selected for the 1994, 1998 and 2002 FIFA World Cups, totalling five matches (only a squad member in the latter edition). Aged 35, he was overlooked for UEFA Euro 2000, played on home soil.

Honours
FC Liège
Belgian Cup: 1989–90

Anderlecht
Belgian First Division: 1992–93, 1993–94, 1994–95
Belgian Cup: 1993–94; runner-up 1996–97
Belgian Supercup: 1991, 1993, 1994, 1995

Metz
Coupe de la Ligue: runner-up 1998–99

'Sint-Truiden'
Belgian Cup: runner-up 2002–03

Belgium
 FIFA Fair Play Trophy: 2002 World Cup

Individual
 Man of the Season (Belgian First Division): 2001–02, 2002–03

References

External links
 
 
 

1965 births
Living people
People from Sint-Truiden
Belgian footballers
Association football wingers
Belgian Pro League players
Challenger Pro League players
RFC Liège players
R.S.C. Anderlecht players
Sint-Truidense V.V. players
Standard Liège players
Ligue 1 players
FC Metz players
Belgium international footballers
1994 FIFA World Cup players
1998 FIFA World Cup players
2002 FIFA World Cup players
Belgian expatriate footballers
Belgian expatriate sportspeople in France
Expatriate footballers in France
Footballers from Limburg (Belgium)